This is a description of the National Register of Historic Places listings in Monroe County, New York.  The locations of properties and districts listed on the National Register of Historic Places in Monroe County, New York may be seen on a map by clicking on "Map all coordinates" to the right.

There are 220 properties and districts listed on the National Register in the county, including three National Historic Landmarks. The city of Rochester includes 117 of these properties and districts, including all National Historic Landmarks; the Rochester properties and districts are listed separately, while the remaining properties and districts in Monroe County are listed here. One property, the New York State Barge Canal, a National Historic Landmark District, spans both the city and the remainder of the county.

Current listings

Rochester

Outside Rochester

|}

See also

National Register of Historic Places listings in New York

References

Monroe County